Nassarius sinusigerus is a species of sea snail, a marine gastropod mollusk in the family Nassariidae, the nassa mud snails or dog whelks.

Description
The shell size varies between 6.5 mm and 12 mm

Distribution
This species occurs in the Red Sea and in the Indian Ocean off Madagascar, off the Philippines and in the central Pacific Ocean.

References

 Dautzenberg, Ph. (1929). Mollusques testacés marins de Madagascar. Faune des Colonies Francaises, Tome III
 Cernohorsky W. O. (1984). Systematics of the family Nassariidae (Mollusca: Gastropoda). Bulletin of the Auckland Institute and Museum 14: 1–356
 Vine, P. (1986). Red Sea Invertebrates. Immel Publishing, London. 224 pp
 Lozouet P. & Plaziat J.C. (2008) Mangrove environments and molluscs. Abatan River, Bohol and Panglao Islands, central Philippines. Hackenheim: Conchbooks. 160 pp.

External links
 Adams, A. (1852-1853). Catalogue of the species of Nassa, a genus of gasteropodous Mollusca belonging to the family Buccinidae, in the collection of Hugh Cuming, Esq., with the description of some new species. Proceedings of the Zoological Society of London. (1851) 19: 94-112
 A. A. (1860). Descriptions of new shells collected by the United States North Pacific Exploring Expedition. Proceedings of the Boston Society of Natural History. 7: 323-336
 Smith, E. A. (1899). Natural history notes from H.M. Indian Marine Survey Steamer 'Investigator,' Commander T. H. Heming, R.N. — Series III., No. 1. On Mollusca from the Bay of Bengal and the Arabian Sea. Annals and Magazine of Natural History. ser. 7, 4 (22): 237-251
 Melvill, J. C. & Standen, R. (1901). The Mollusca of the Persian Gulf, Gulf of Oman and Arabian Seas as evidenced mainly through the collections of Mr. F. W. Townsend, 1893-1900, with descriptions of new species. Part 1, Cephalopoda, Gastropoda, Scaphopoda. Proceedings of the Zoological Society of London. 1901 (2): 327-460.
  Cernohorsky W.O. (1981). Revision of the Australian and New Zealand Tertiary and Recent species of the family Nassariidae (Mollusca: Gastropoda). Records of the Auckland Institute and Museum 18:137–192
 

Nassariidae
Gastropods described in 1851